Robert M. Haas (January 3, 1889 – December 17, 1962) was an American art director. He was nominated for two Academy Awards in the category Best Art Direction. He worked on over 120 films between 1919 and 1950. He was born in Newark, New Jersey and died in Costa Mesa, California.

Selected filmography
Haas was nominated for two Academy Awards for Best Art Direction:
 Life with Father (1947)
 Johnny Belinda (1948)

References

External links

1889 births
1962 deaths
American art directors
Artists from Newark, New Jersey